Bugnon may refer to:

Surname 
 Alex Bugnon (1958-), jazz pianist
 André Bugnon (1947-), Swiss politician

Places 
 Bugnon, the site where the campus of the University Hospital of Lausanne and several buildings of the Faculty of Biology and Medicine of the University of Lausanne are located
 Gymnase cantonal du Bugnon, a high school in Lausanne